The Serviola-class patrol boats are a series of patrol boats built in 1990 at the shipyard in Ferrol in the former Empresa Nacional Bazan (now NAVANTIA) for the Spanish Navy. They entered service with the Spanish Navy from October 1992. They are based in the Galician port of Ferrol making most of their patrols along the Galician and Cantabrian coasts.

They are designed to remain at sea for long periods of time and withstand rough sea conditions without significant degradation of their capabilities. Each ship is equipped with a flight deck that allows it to operate medium-sized helicopters, a sick bay with six beds, and two rigid inflatable boats.

There are currently four ships in service.

On 3 May 2011 the Spanish patrol boat  entered waters around Gibraltar and ordered ships to leave the area. She met  of the Royal Navy and left after about 90 minutes.

Ships

References

Patrol vessels of the Spanish Navy
Patrol ship classes